() is a Vietnamese annual TV satirical comedy that is broadcast across all channels of the Vietnamese national broadcaster Vietnam Television (VTV) on Lunar New Year's Eve, and produced by the Vietnam Television Film Center (VFC). The show is widely popular in Vietnam, and is considered a television staple of the Vietnamese New Year period.

 is known for its comedic take on the socio-political and economical issues of the year in Vietnam. VFC has been producing the show for VTV since 2003. The show features some of the biggest names of Vietnamese comedy, including Quốc Khánh, Vân Dung, Quang Thắng, Tự Long, Công Lý and Xuân Bắc.

History 
 has been produced by the Vietnam Television Film Center since 2003. The show was originally produced as a special Lunar New Year episode of VTV's former comedy show  ("Weekend reunion").  became a separate program in 2006.

Premise 
The show is mainly set in Heaven, where Ngọc Hoàng rules. He has two assistants, the gods Nam Tào and Bắc Đẩu (named after the two star constellations Crux and Big Dipper) who helps him manage affairs of the earthly kingdom. There are a few other characters off-handedly mentioned, but usually only Thiên Lôi (God of Thunder) is on-screen and often has to run Heaven's errands.

Every year, Ngọc Hoàng assembles the Táo Quân(s) (Kitchen Gods) to Heaven to report the affairs in Vietnam throughout the year to him. Unlike the original legend, there could be multiple Táo(s), each in charge of one aspect of the country's society (such as transportation, economy, education, culture or tourism, but no politics, military or defense). The Táo(s) are typically named after the division they are in charge of, although in 2015 they are named after the Five Elementals (Wu Xing).

Táo(s) report directly to Ngọc Hoàng with the presence of Nam Tào and Bắc Đẩu, who often find faults in their reports and run into arguments. Ngọc Hoàng typically hears the stories and makes comments, but can be sarcastic and show unexpected talents and remarks. Although the majority of reports are done by prose, sometimes the reports can be told by other forms, such as dancing, singing or short plays. The reports highlight the socio-political and economical issues of the past year in Vietnam, often interpreted in a more comedic and light-hearted manner.

At the end of the assembly, all of the Táo(s) gather, and Ngọc Hoàng reads the final remarks. The show ends with the cast and presenter Thảo Vân (absent in 2022) wishing audiences a happy new year.

Starting from 2009, in addition to the main plot, the show also includes an accompanying theme and scenario.
 In 2009, the Táo Quân(s) presented Hoa Táo, a parody of the beauty competition Miss Vietnam.
 In 2011, the show was named Táo Idol with the format based on Vietnam Idol.
 In 2013, the show was based on the format of The Voice of Vietnam. In addition, Ngọc Hoàng, Nam Tào and Bắc Đẩu switched bodies by order, unbeknownst to the Táo Quân(s).
 In 2014, Ngọc Hoàng had a sore throat and could not attend the assembly. Nam Tào and Bắc Đẩu was forced to find a lookalike, Tèo (also played by Quốc Khánh) and trained him to act as a temporary replacement for Ngọc Hoàng.
 In 2015, the later part of the show featured a competition where Ngọc Hoàng requested to find a third sidekick in the zenith for him, alongside Nam Tào and Bắc Đẩu.
 In 2018, the show marked its 15th anniversary, but the reporting part was removed. Instead, this year's show featured a catwalk runway and a competition to win the title of "the first quintessence Táo".

Musical performances 
The show frequently features music and dance performances throughout. Although the settings and costumes are based on the imperial era, the singers (and at times the actors themselves) can change to a more contemporary look, if necessary. The show also frequently parodies Vietnamese and foreign songs, by rewriting the lyrics for storytelling purposes. Many performances later become Internet memes in Vietnam. The incomplete list includes:

Cast
Quốc Khánh (as Ngọc Hoàng), Xuân Bắc (as Nam Tào) and Công Lý (as Bắc Đẩu until 2021) are the show's regulars. The remaining Táo roles are played by various actors and actresses.

Regular roles
 Quốc Khánh as Ngọc Hoàng (2004–present): ruler of Heaven. Every year, he listens to reports from the Táo Quân(s) on matters down on Earth (Vietnam). He cares for the common people and is focused on proposing ways to improve their life and well-being. He sometimes can be childish or flirtatious.
 Công Lý as Bắc Đẩu (2003–2021, 2023): Ngọc Hoàng's assistant alongside Nam Tào. They have a softer personality than Nam Tào, although on reporting matters they can be sharp and critical. They often quarrel with Nam Tào on various issues; however, both Nam Tào and Bắc Đẩu generally work well with each other. They respect Ngọc Hoàng, but sometimes speak ill behind his back. Công Lý exited the show as a regular due to health reasons in 2022, with Trung Ruồi taking over the role for that year. Công Lý returned as Bắc Đẩu in 2023 in a guest capacity.
 Xuân Bắc as Nam Tào (2003–2021, 2023–present): Ngọc Hoàng's assistant alongside Bắc Đẩu. He is not afraid of harsh statements towards the Táo(s) in their reports, although he is prone to corruption and has accepted bribery from the Táo(s) multiple times. Đỗ Duy Nam took over the role for 2022.

Recurring roles 
Since the roles of Táo change every year, the following list goes by actor.
 Vân Dung (2003–present): she alternates in different years between Táo Y tế (Healthcare) and Táo Giáo dục (Education).
 Quang Thắng (2003–present): often enters with a grand entrance. He assumes the role of Táo Kinh tế (Economy) in most years, although in some years he plays the role of Táo Giáo dục (Education).
 Chí Trung (2005–present): he generally takes the role of Táo Giao thông (Transportation) or equivalent.
 Tự Long (2003–present): a comedian originated from chèo, hence his acts often incorporate songs and performances. He assumes the role of Táo Văn hoá (Culture) in most years.

Non-frequent appearances

 Quốc Trượng (as Ngọc Hoàng) (2003)
 Minh Hằng: (2005–2007, 2009, 2012–2013, 2015, 2018)
 Minh Vượng (2004–2008, 2018)
 Thành Trung (2007–2014)
 Thu Hương (2003)
 Hiệp Gà (2004, 2007, 2009–2011): play the role of Gia Cát Dự. He claims to be a descendant of Zhuge Liang at his divine power of prediction, although he usually predicts everything wrong. In 2011, he took the role of Táo Quy Hoạch (City planner).
 Phạm Bằng (2005–2006)
 Anh Tuấn (2009)
 Bá Anh (2007–2008)
 Văn Hiệp (2006)
 Quốc Quân (2004, 2006, 2012)
 Bình Trọng (2006, 2008–2009, 2011–2012)
 Đức Hải (2010)
 Đức Khuê (2010)
 Đỗ Duy Nam (2014, 2017–present)
 Trung Ruồi (2017–present)
 Lâm Vỹ Dạ (2021)
 Mạnh Hưng (2021)
 Mạnh Dũng (2016–present)

Supporting roles

Every year, the show features other celebrities and comedians playing supporting characters. The supporting cast are listed below in order of year of appearance:

 Tiến Quang (2003, 2005–2006)
 Phú Đôn (2003–2004)
 Giang Còi (2003, 2005)
 Bình Trọng (as Thiên Lôi, the God of Thunder) (2006, 2008 - 2009, 2011 - 2012)
 Hoàng Sơn (2006)											
 Mai Sơn (2006)											
 Viết Thái (2006)											
 Tạ Am	(2006)											
 Nhật Cường (2006)											
 Thế Anh (2007)
 Chiến Thắng (2007)
 Hải Anh (2008)
 Phan Anh (2011)
 Kiên Trung (2011, 2014)
 Quốc Anh (2012)
 Minh Quân (2013–2016, 2018)
 Việt Bắc (2014, 2018, 2021–present)
 Tiến Minh (2014, 2021)
 Chí Tài (2015)
 Việt Hương (2015)
 Tuấn Hưng (2015)
 Bình Minh (2016)
 Quân Anh (2016–18)
 Xuân Bắc's sons (2018)
 Đức Hùng (fashion designer) (2018) 
 Lan Hương (2019)

Timeline of actors/actresses
 Legend
 Featured as a main character.
 Featured as a supporting character.

Episodes

Lunar New Years

International New Years

Filming and broadcasting
The show is broadcast across all of VTV's channels on Vietnamese New Year's Eve every year since its inception. Initially from 2003 to 2005 and 2007,  was filmed at S9 studio – Vietnam Television and until 2008, Kim Mã Theater was chosen as the location for filming; in 2006, 2009, 2010 - 2014 and 2018 - 2022, the show was filmed at The Vietnam – Soviet Friendship Labor Culture Palace (Vietnamese: Cung Văn hoá Lao động Hữu nghị Việt – Xô) in Hanoi. In 2015 and 2017, the show was filmed at S14 studio – Vietnam Television. In 2016, the show was filmed at S15 studio – Vietnam Television.

From 2010 to 2013, in addition, the show was released on DVD a week before the air date. The DVD version has the full recording and is usually longer and slightly different from the TV version. However, since 2014, VTV stopped releasing DVDs and started releasing the show digitally. The 2014 release was handled by CNC and the 2015 to 2017 release was distributed by VTV Digital (VTV Go). The 2018 show was released exclusively on VTV's multi-platform entertainment portal VTVGiaiTri.

As a result of its popularity, many other TV channels have copied 's format.

On YouTube, the show has achieved more than 320 million views (this includes all of the versions and performances).

The actors have about two months to prepare for the show, which begins production one week before the television air date. The show is shot in 3 days, afterwards it is edited to fit in its 2-hour broadcasting block on television (including commercials). An extended cut, typically at around 3 hours, is subsequently released.

As Lunar New Year is also a busy time for Vietnamese comedians, the cast often has to rehearse at nighttime, which takes a toll on their health and personal life. For instance, in 2017, Quốc Khánh (who portrays the Emperor) lost his mother at the time of rehearsals and had to take on responsibilities for her funeral as well as for the show. Such demanding schedule, however, do not deter big names from committing to the show.

Controversies 
In 2009, two performances by Táo Điện lực ("Electrical Manager") (played by Minh Hang), in which she was singing songs asking for government funding, were censored. One performance was completely removed from the broadcast and the other was replaced by a later re-recorded version with changes in its lyrics. In that same special, a verse (also about asking the government for money) from a song called "Lụt từ ngã tư đường phố" (Flood from the Crossroads) performed by Táo Thoát nước ("Drainaging Manager") was also removed from the broadcast. However, all the original uncut performances from the special were later leaked onto the internet.

In 2013, VFC and VTV were requested to censor some of the jokes that were considered offensive and inappropriate by the Department of Arts and Performance ( or shortened to NTBD). As such, the DVD release for the show came four days later than planned.

In 2015, the Department of Arts and Performance asked VFC to submit the full script of the show to be reviewed before taping but the request was denied by VFC. Đỗ Thanh Hải – the show's creative director –  spoke out against the department's move. To avoid censorship from the NTBD, the show had to be moved to Studio 14 of VTV, a venue that is smaller than the Viet Xo Friendship Labour Cultural Place, where the show was planned to take place.

In 2017, some of the show's jokes were censored by VTV. However, VFC later released the original cut of the show on YouTube.

In 2018, VFC and VTV were criticized for allowing several offensive jokes on the LGBT community and body shaming. The issue was met with polarized reactions but VFC and VTV gave no further comments.

References

See also
CCTV New Year's Gala
Little Blue Light
List of television programmes broadcast by Vietnam Television (VTV)

New Year's television specials
2000s Vietnamese television series
2010s Vietnamese television series
2003 Vietnamese television series debuts